Kayhan Mortezavi (born 9 June 1956 in Tehran, Iran) is a prominent film art director/production designer, and director.  He has also been a university professor at University of Tehran, Alzahra University, Tehran University of Art , and Iran Broadcasting University, (1982–1994).  Kayhan Mortezavi has been nomina  twice for the best production designer at Fajr International Film Festival (1989 and 1991), and won the award for the best TV art direction at Sima Festival - IRIB, 1992.

Life 
Kayhan Mortezavi is a graduate of theatre, with a BFA in Art Direction from Tehran University of Art, a MA in Philosophy of Art (Art-Research) from University of Tehran, and also a degree in Education form faculty of Education, York University - Toronto, Canada. He began his career as a theatre set designer in 1979, and as a film and TV Art director from 1982. He has worked as a production designer and director at various film, TV, and theatre productions in Iran, Canada, and USA.

External links
Youtube

References 

 Film Jurors
 

1956 births
Living people
Iranian film directors
Tehran University of Art alumni
University of Tehran alumni